Hawkenbury is a hamlet in the Maidstone district of Kent, England, in the civil parish of Staplehurst.

Hawkenbury is approximately 2 miles north-east of Staplehurst and 2 miles north-west of Headcorn.

Amenities include a pub with rooms, campsite and garden centre.

Villages in Kent